Kaleb Tarczewski (born February 26, 1993) is an American professional basketball player who last played for Olimpia Milano of the Italian Lega Basket Serie A and the EuroLeague. He played college basketball for Arizona. He is a 2.13 m (7'0") tall center.

High school career
Tarczewski attended Stevens High School in Claremont, New Hampshire for two years, leading Stevens High School's varsity basketball team to the NHIAA Final Four in 2008-2009. Tarczewski transferred to St. Mark's School in Southborough, Massachusetts after that season. Ranked as the No. 4 overall prospect in the country and the No. 3 center with a scout grade of 97 by ESPN in the class of 2012, Tarczewski led St. Mark's to a 28-2 record as a senior for coach Dave Lubick. He was named MVP of the Independent School League. Tarczewski averaged 17.0 points and 12 rebounds per game as a junior, and averaged 20.7 points, 10.2 rebounds and 2.7 blocks per game while shooting 63 percent from the floor as a senior. He tallied 14 points (6-of-8 FGs) and 10 rebounds in the Jordan Brand Classic, April 14 in Charlotte, North Carolina. He saw eight minutes of action in the 2012 Nike Hoop Summit, April 7 in Portland, Oregon. Among his other honors, Tarczewski helped the Lions to four consecutive NEPSAC championship games, including a victory in the 2012 Class AA title game, and was a first-team all-NEPSAC Class AA selection as a junior and senior. He participated in the Adidas Nations top-50 camp, the Adidas Super 64, the Double Pump Best of the Summer event and the Peach Jam tournament prior to his senior season.

College career
Tarczewski played four seasons with Arizona, helping the Wildcats to reach 110 victories, tying the school record. In his senior season, he averaged 9.4 points, 9.3 rebounds and 1.4 blocks and was named to the Pac-12 All-Conference Second Team and the Pac-12 All-Defensive Team.

College statistics

|-
| style="text-align:left;"| 2012–13
| style="text-align:left;"| Arizona
| 35 || 35 || 22.0 || .538 || .000 || .633 || 6.1 || 0.4 || 0.3 || 0.7 || 6.6
|-
| style="text-align:left;"| 2013–14
| style="text-align:left;"| Arizona
| 36 || 35 || 28.3 || .584 || .000 || .756 || 6.3 || 0.5 || 0.1 || 1.0 || 9.9
|-
| style="text-align:left;"| 2014–15
| style="text-align:left;"| Arizona
| 38 || 37 || 26.0 || .572 || .000 || .699 || 5.2 || 0.3 || 0.3 || 0.6 || 9.3
|-
| style="text-align:left;"| 2015–16
| style="text-align:left;"| Arizona
| 26 || 24 || 27.4 || .533 || .000 || .712 || 9.3 || 0.6 || 0.3 || 1.4 || 9.4
|-
| style="text-align:left;"| Career
| style="text-align:left;"|
| 135 || 131 || 25.8 || .561 || .000 || .704 || 6.5 || 0.5 || 0.3 || 0.9 || 8.8

Professional career statistics

Domestic Leagues 

|-
| style="text-align:left;" rowspan=2| 2016–17
| style="text-align:left;"|  Oklahoma City Blue
| style="text-align:left;"| NBA G League
| 41 || 25.5 || 63.3% || - || 72.7% || 7.3 || 0.5 || 0.3 || 0.7 || 10.1
|-
| style="text-align:left;"|  EA7 Emporio Armani Milano
| style="text-align:left;"| Serie A
| 17 || 14.7 || 58.3% || - || 66.7% || 5.1 || 0.5 || 0.3 || 0.5 || 6.7
|- style="background:#AFE6BA;"
| style="text-align:left;" | 2017-18
| style="text-align:left;"|  EA7 Emporio Armani Milano
| style="text-align:left;" | Serie A
| 30 || 18.4 || 68.3% || - || 80.7% || 6.5 || 0.3 || 0.4 || 0.7 || 7.7
|-
| style="text-align:left;" | 2018-19
| style="text-align:left;"|  AX Armani Exchange Milano
| style="text-align:left;" | Serie A
| 27 || 22.5 || 78.3% || - || 61.0% || 7.1 || 0.7 || 0.3 || 0.7 || 10.7

EuroLeague

|-
| style="text-align:left;"| 2017–18
| style="text-align:left;"|  EA7 Emporio Armani Milano
| 30 || 29 || 19.7 || 64.4% || - || 73.7% || 5.7 || 0.3 || 0.3 || 0.8 || 6.7 || 10.1
|-
| style="text-align:left;"| 2018–19
| style="text-align:left;"|  AX Armani Exchange Milano
| 24 || 24 || 18.2 || 72.4% || - || 69.2% || 4.6 || 0.4 || 0.4 || 0.7 || 6.4 || 8.8

Professional career
After going undrafted in the 2016 NBA draft, Tarczewski joined the Detroit Pistons for the Orlando Summer League and the Washington Wizards for the Las Vegas Summer League. He signed with the Oklahoma City Thunder on September 23, 2016, but was later waived on October 24 after appearing in two preseason games. On November 3, he was acquired by the Oklahoma City Blue.

On March 14, 2017, Tarczewski signed with Olimpia Milano for the remainder of the season. He posted 6.7 points and 5.1 rebounds per game. On June 30, 2018, he inked a two-year contract extension. During the 2019-20 season, he averaged 8.1 points and 5.8 rebounds per game. Tarczewski signed a three-year contract extension in May 2020. On July 2, 2022, Tarczewski officially parted ways with the Italian club after five years, having won seven domestic titles and reached the EuroLeague Final Four once (2021) during his stint.

National team career
Tarczewski represented the United States national team at the 2015 Pan American Games, where he won a bronze medal.

References

External links
 Arizona Wildcats bio
 EuroLeague profile
 

1993 births
Living people
American expatriate basketball people in Italy
American men's basketball players
American people of Polish descent
Arizona Wildcats men's basketball players
Basketball players at the 2015 Pan American Games
Basketball players from New Hampshire
Centers (basketball)
Lega Basket Serie A players
Medalists at the 2015 Pan American Games
Oklahoma City Blue players
Olimpia Milano players
Pan American Games bronze medalists for the United States
Pan American Games medalists in basketball
Parade High School All-Americans (boys' basketball)
People from Claremont, New Hampshire
St. Mark's School (Massachusetts) alumni
United States men's national basketball team players